Akinator is a video game developed by French company Elokence. During gameplay, it attempts to determine what fictional or real-life character, object, or animal the player is thinking of by asking a series of questions (similar to the game Twenty Questions). It uses an artificial intelligence program that learns the best questions to ask through its experience with players.

Gameplay
Before beginning the questionnaire, the players must think of a character, object, or animal. Akinator initiates a series of questions, with "Yes", "No", "Probably", "Probably not" and "Don't know" as possible answers, to narrow down the potential item. If the answer is narrowed down to a single likely option before 25 questions are asked, the program will automatically ask whether the item it chose is correct. If it is guessed wrong a few times in a row, the game will prompt the user to input the item's name to expand its database of choices.

Development
The game is based on the Limule program made by Elokence, and runs on an internally designed algorithm.

Reception
L'Express rated Akinator a 5 out of 5 on their list of iPhone Apps of the Week for September 9, 2009. Excite France stated that Akinator is just that interactive. "It is revolutionary, attractive, and entertaining."

In Europe, the game reached its peak popularity in 2009.

References

External links
 

2007 video games
Applications of artificial intelligence
Fictional genies
IOS games
Android (operating system) games
Browser games
Video games based on Arabian mythology
Video games developed in France
Video games about genies
Windows Phone games
Websites